Tom Magnar Hetland (born 10 July 1954 in Sandnes) is a Norwegian journalist and editor.

He majored in history at the University of Bergen, with minors in Norwegian and Russian. While studying he was editor in Norsk Tidend. He also worked as a journalist in various minor newspapers.

He was hired as a journalist Stavanger Aftenblad in 1986 and became political editor in 1998. In 2002 he was appointed acting chief editor; the position was made permanent in 2003.

References
Norwegian Wikipedia

1954 births
Living people
People from Sandnes
Norwegian newspaper editors
University of Bergen alumni